The armadillo shoe (alternately armadillo heel or armadillo boot) is a high fashion platform shoe created by British fashion designer Alexander McQueen for his final collection, Plato's Atlantis (Spring/Summer 2010). Only 24 pairs exist: 21 were made during the initial production in 2009, and three were made in 2015 for a charity auction. The shoes are named for their unusual convex curved shape, said to resemble an armadillo. American singer Lady Gaga famously wore the shoes in several public appearances, including the music video for her 2009 single "Bad Romance".

Critical response to the armadillo heels was extensive, both immediately following the show and in retrospect. They are considered iconic in the context of the Plato's Atlantis show, McQueen's body of work, and in fashion history in general. Critics have referred to them as both grotesque and beautiful, sometimes in the same review. Much of the negative criticism focused on the height of the heel, which has been viewed as impractical, even unsafe. Other writers have explored the shoes as artistic statements. Pairs of armadillo heels have been featured in museum exhibitions, most prominently in the McQueen retrospective Alexander McQueen: Savage Beauty, first shown at the Metropolitan Museum of Art in New York City in 2011.

Background 

British designer Alexander McQueen was known in the fashion industry for dramatic, theatrical fashion shows featuring imaginative, sometimes controversial designs. He had designed extreme footwear for previous collections, including high platform shoes inspired by the Japanese geta and Venetian chopine for his Spring/Summer 2008 collection, La Dame Bleue, and houndstooth platforms for Autumn/Winter 2009, The Horn of Plenty.

For his Spring/Summer 2010 collection, Plato's Atlantis, McQueen took inspiration from climate change and Charles Darwin's theory of evolution, envisioning a world where humans evolved to survive underwater after global flooding. The collection was presented on the catwalk at Paris Fashion Week on 6 October 2009. The show began with designs that used earth tones and digitally printed animal skin patterns to invoke the appearance of land animals, and gradually transitioned into designs featuring abstract prints in aqua and blue, suggesting that the models were adapting to an increasingly submerged planet. The show's final outfit, entitled "Neptune's Daughter", was covered entirely in enormous blue-green opalescent sequins, representing the model's full transition to an underwater environment. It was worn by Polina Kasina, who had long been McQueen's fit model. Plato's Atlantis was McQueen's final fully realised collection; he died by suicide in 2010.

Design 
The armadillo shoes are almost  from top to floor, with a  spike heel. The vertical body of the shoe is shaped in a convex curve, which has been compared to the silhouette of an armadillo, lobster claw, or animal hoof. Their shape is generally regarded as unique in high fashion, although museum curator Helen Persson found a precedent in the shape of Persian riding boots of the 16th century.

The shoe hides the entire foot from ankle to toe, creating the illusion that the wearer is walking en pointe in the manner of a ballerina. In actuality the ball of the foot rests at an angle on a concealed platform, with a small bulge above the toe to facilitate lifting the heavy shoe to walk. In keeping with the animalistic theme of the collection, each pair is uniquely decorated in animal skin such as python skin or shagreen (rawhide from the cowtail stingray), or iridescent paillettes resembling scales.

History

Development and runway show 

McQueen sketched the initial idea for the shoes in early 2009, taking inspiration from the work of British pop artist Allen Jones and Australian fashion designer Leigh Bowery. He commissioned shoe designer Georgina Goodman to realise the concept. Each pair was hand-carved from wood in Italy. The Daily Beast reported that the complex manufacturing process "spanned five days and involved 30 people, using material from three suppliers and passing through three factories". The inner lining and outer shell were shaped separately and fitted together; each section required two zippers for access. For the original collection, 21 pairs were made, 20 of which were worn during the Plato's Atlantis October 2009 fashion show.

Designed as showpieces, the shoes were never commercially produced, although many were sold to private buyers following the show. The Alexander McQueen Archive in London retains ownership of at least five pairs, including the pair covered with iridescent scales worn in the final outfit of the show. The Metropolitan Museum of Art (The Met) in New York City owns two pairs, one made from turquoise shagreen and another in black leather with metal accents.

The unusual shape made walking in the shoes notoriously difficult. The show's producer, Sam Gainsbury, tested them the night before the show and found walking impossible. When he complained of this to McQueen and suggested the models were at risk of falling, the designer responded, "If they fall, they fall." In the end, models Abbey Lee Kershaw, Natasha Poly and Sasha Pivovarova all declined to walk in Plato's Atlantis because of their concerns that the heels were too high to be safe. In the 2018 documentary McQueen model Magdalena Frąckowiak said that she found walking in them "really frightening". Despite these concerns, no models fell at the show, which was regarded as "miraculous" by the fashion press. Shortly after the Plato's Atlantis show, staffers from British Vogue tested the shoes and found them difficult to walk in. Months after the show McQueen confirmed in an interview with trade journal Women's Wear Daily that he had never tested the armadillos personally. He made it clear that he was far less concerned with practicality than with visual effect, saying elsewhere, "The world needs fantasy, not reality. We have enough reality today."

Celebrity wear 

Celebrities have worn armadillo heels for red carpet appearances and photoshoots. The first of these was in November 2009, when British socialite Daphne Guinness wore a pair in nude-coloured leather and reported that they were "surprisingly comfortable". Guinness also wore a pair of snakeskin armadillo boots in a shoot for Vogue Italia in February 2010. American singer Kelis wore another nude leather pair on the red carpet in January 2010. American actress Demi Moore wore a tan pair on the April 2010 cover of Harper's Bazaar.

American singer Lady Gaga, who became a friend of McQueen's shortly before his suicide, premiered her 2009 single "Bad Romance" at the Plato's Atlantis show. For the single's music video, released November 2009, Gaga wore the opalescent "Neptune's Daughter" outfit that closed the Plato's Atlantis show, including the matching armadillo shoes. Gaga wore a pair of armadillo heels in python skin when she arrived at the MTV Video Music Awards in September 2010; she described this look in 2018 as the top outfit of her career. Later that month, she wore the same pair with a dress made of hair for a performance at The Oak Room at New York's Plaza Hotel.

Three brand-new pairs were created in 2015 by McQueen's label in partnership with Christie's auction house, which sold them to raise money for the UNICEF 2015 Nepal earthquake relief fund. Initially expected to sell for ,000 all together, they eventually sold for a combined total of $295,000. All three pairs were sold to American actor Taylor Kinney, who gifted them to Lady Gaga, then his fiancée. In 2016 Gaga was the guest editor for the Spring preview issue of Vmagazine, which featured a photoshoot of herself and Guinness wearing armadillo heels.

Reception and cultural legacy 

Critical reaction to the armadillo shoes was immediate and polarised. Many reviewers described them as both grotesque and beautiful in the same breath. They were particularly noted for their complete visual departure from the natural structure of the human foot. Critics often described the models as looking alien, monstrous, or inhuman while wearing them. They are often described as an iconic element of the Plato's Atlantis collection and of McQueen's body of work in general. In 2012, British Vogue called them one of the 20 all-time most iconic shoes.

Although there was some criticism of their appearance, much of the negative reaction centered on the perceived impracticality of walking in the armadillo heels. Some critics labelled the impractical design a feminist issue, pointing out that female models were being expected to walk in extreme heels designed by a man. Costume design professor Deborah Bell wrote that they transformed the model into a "hunted victim".

Critics viewing them in retrospect have described their effect on high fashion footwear as groundbreaking. By 2010, fashion journalists were crediting the armadillo heels as one source of a trend towards extreme high heels both on the runway and in everyday fashion. In 2018, Aria Darcella argued in Fashionista that "never in fashion has a shoe eclipsed the rest of a collection". Later that year, in an article that celebrated deliberately unappealing fashion, The Paris Review called them "aggressively ugly" while noting that they had "forever change[d] footwear." Writing for the American edition of Vogue in 2020, Steff Yotka described them as "the progenitor of our obsession with really quite bizarre footwear".

Since their debut, the armadillo shoes have been featured in four museum exhibitions. Several pairs from the Alexander McQueen Archive were featured at Alexander McQueen: Savage Beauty, a retrospective exhibition of McQueen's work, which appeared at The Met in 2011 and the Victoria and Albert Museum (V&A) of London in 2015. The shoes also appeared in the 2015 V&A exhibition Shoes: Pleasure and Pain. In 2017, Kelis lent her pair to the Museum of Modern Art for a fashion exhibition entitled Items: Is Fashion Modern? At least three pairs of armadillo heels appeared in the 2022 exhibition Lee Alexander McQueen: Mind, Mythos, Muse, shown at the Los Angeles County Museum of Art and the National Gallery of Victoria.

Academic explorations 

Some writers have explored the artistic and cultural implications of the armadillo heels. Their existence as impractical but visually striking footwear has been used to support the argument that fashion is an art form in its own right. Writing for The New York Times in 2009, Amanda Fortini connected their immense height to the so-called hemline theory, which posits that fashion designs tend to reflect the state of the economy. She suggested that the extreme heels on the armadillo boots reflected an attempt to "lift our collective spirits" given the impact of the Great Recession of 2008. Fashion historians Beth Dincuff Charleston and Francesca Granata have each argued, in 2010 and 2017 respectively, that the shoes function closer to medical or corrective devices than footwear.

Mass media theorist Paul Hegarty discussed Lady Gaga's use of the armadillo heels in her "Bad Romance" video as a combination of dominance and submission: their height restricts Gaga's movement, indicating submissiveness, but her ability to walk in them indicates a subversive kind of dominance. In this way, the video "looks at complicity with controls as a way of surmounting them". In 2014 Isabelle Szmigin and Maria Piacentini discussed them as an example of how high fashion conceptsin this case, extremely high heelsare absorbed into popular culture and then spread to individuals, affecting their desires and behaviour as consumers.

Shahidha Bari, professor of fashion cultures, described them in 2020 as a parody of a ballerina's pointe shoes: "gorgeous and cruel, but it also makes explicit the mercilessness of the pointe shoe". Philosopher Gwenda-Lin Grewal called them an example of surrealist high comedy in fashion, comparing them to the absurdist shoe hat created by Italian designer Elsa Schiaparelli in 1937.

Performance scholar Franziska Bork Petersen picked up the thread of Charleston and Granata's arguments in her book Body Utopianism (2022), analysing the armadillo shoes as analogous to prosthetics in their altering of the human form. Petersen noted that while watching the runway show, the distinctive gait of the models wearing the armadillo heels became a visual norm, and that the more typical gait of models wearing other shoes "stand out in their otherness". She argues that their ability to wear the difficult shoes proficiently makes them "technicians" on the runway, and that it is the movement of the models which completes the visual impact of the shoe. She situates the unusual shape of the shoe as typical of fashion rather than an outlier, arguing that throughout the history of fashion design, clothing and footwear have significantly altered the natural shape of the human body. Although she critiques the armadillo shoes for existing as commercial rather than strictly artistic objects, Petersen concludes that the radical alteration the shoes make to the appearance of the body can "open up the possibility to encounter the familiar human body as strange", allowing for unconventional ideas of beauty to emerge in the viewer.

References 

2009 in fashion
Alexander McQueen
British fashion
Lady Gaga
Shoes
High-heeled footwear